Land of the Rising Sun is a role-playing game published by Fantasy Games Unlimited in 1980.

Description
Land of the Rising Sun is a samurai system set in feudal Japan. The game is  a class-and-level system descended from Chivalry & Sorcery, with rules covering honor, martial arts, aerial and water combat, the astral plane, spirits, demons, and ninjas.

Publication history
Land of the Rising Sun was designed by Lee Gold and published by Fantasy Games Unlimited in 1980 as a boxed set with a 152-page book and five cardstock reference sheets.

Reception
Forrest Johnson reviewed Land of the Rising Sun in The Space Gamer No. 36. Johnson commented that "LOTRS is a beautiful treasure in an unopenable package. Recommended to zealots, and as a source-book to D&D."

Eric Goldberg reviewed Land of the Rising Sun in Ares Magazine #7 and commented that "Land of the Rising Sun is an estimable addition to a FRP aficionado's library. Aside from being well-explained, it is necessary for those who want to fully understand C&S. The care with which Japanese myth has been reproduced is simply amazing."

Wes Ives reviewed Land of the Rising Sun for Different Worlds magazine and stated that "In summary, I strongly recommend Land of the Rising Sun to the role-players in the readership. It is a complete, entertaining game."

Lawrence Schick stated that the game is: "Difficult to play, but the sections describing the society, culture, and legendry of medieval Japan are quite detailed."

References

Chivalry & Sorcery
Fantasy Games Unlimited games
Historical role-playing games
Martial arts role-playing games
Role-playing games introduced in 1980